ABC Central Coast is an ABC Local Radio station based in Gosford and broadcasting to the Central Coast region in New South Wales. The transmission area of the station stretches from Woy Woy to The Entrance. The signal is notoriously weak in many valley areas of the region.

The station official callsign is 2BL/T reflecting its function as an opt-out service of 702 ABC Sydney.  The station commenced broadcasting in 2003 on the frequency of 92.5 FM.

History 
The station was the newest radio station when it opened on 27 November 2003 in Gosford. The first studios were located in one of Australia's largest malls, Erina Fair, and were dubbed the Fishbowl, due to the station being an experiment in the new style of accessible, local, listener driven radio. In 2014, the station relocated studios to the base of The Kensmen Building on 131-133 Donnison Street in the CBD.

References

See also
 List of radio stations in Australia

Central Coast
Radio stations in New South Wales
Radio stations established in 2003